Xylopachygaster is a genus of flies in the family Stratiomyidae.

Species
Xylopachygaster japonica (Miyatake, 1965)
Xylopachygaster mamaevi Krivosheina, 1973

References

Stratiomyidae
Brachycera genera
Diptera of Asia